Tipepidine (INN) (brand names Asverin, Antupex, Asvelik, Asvex, Bitiodin, Cofdenin A, Hustel, Nodal, Sotal), also known as tipepidine hibenzate (JAN), is a synthetic, non-opioid antitussive and expectorant of the thiambutene class. It acts as an inhibitor of G protein-coupled inwardly-rectifying potassium channels (GIRKs). The drug was discovered in the 1950s, and was developed in Japan in 1959. It is used as the hibenzate and citrate salts.

The usual dose is 20 mg every 4–6 hours. Possible side effects of tipepidine, especially in overdose, may include drowsiness, vertigo, delirium, disorientation, loss of consciousness, and confusion.

Tipepidine has been investigated as a potential psychiatric drug. It is being investigated in depression, obsessive-compulsive disorder, and attention-deficit hyperactivity disorder (ADHD). Through inhibition of GIRK channels, tipepidine increases dopamine levels in the nucleus accumbens, but without increasing locomotor activity or producing methamphetamine-like behavioral sensitization, and this action appears to be at least partly responsible for its antidepressant-like effects in rodents.

See also 
 Cough syrup
 Noscapine
 Codeine; Pholcodine
 Dextromethorphan; Dimemorfan
 Racemorphan; Dextrorphan; Levorphanol
 Butamirate
 Pentoxyverine
 Cloperastine; Levocloperastine
 Guaifenesin
 Timepidium bromide

References

Antitussives
Expectorants
Piperidines
Potassium channel blockers
Thiophenes